Hill Hook is an area of Sutton Coldfield, Birmingham, England.

The area includes Hill Hook Local Nature Reserve, declared in 2003 with an area of 5.65 hectares, which is on the site of a watermill built in the 17th century. An earlier dam showed the extent of the original mill pool, which was enlarged in 1767. The nature reserve, known locally as 'The Meddies' or 'The Mill Pond' was substantially built upon from the early 1980s onwards, although small parts remain untouched. The Friends of Hill Hook, a local group of The Wildlife Trust for Birmingham and the Black Country work alongside the Council ranger Service to care for the site.

It is close to Four Oaks and Little Aston and is approximately one mile from Sutton Park. The area is served by Blake Street railway station, and is served by National Express West Midlands routes 604 and X3. Midland Classic of Burton previously operated an hourly X12 service between Burton and Sutton Coldfield, however this was cut to terminate at Lichfield and subsequently the X3 extended to Lichfield half hourly to cover this gap. Prior to the X12, for many years Stevensons of Uttoxeter  operated service 112 which ran between Birmingham, via Erdington, Sutton Coldfield & Lichfield, and Burton-upon-Trent and which also served Blake Street railway station.

References

External links
Nature reserve

Areas of Birmingham, West Midlands
Sutton Coldfield
Local Nature Reserves in the West Midlands (county)